The name of "Coroners Court" is the generic name given to proceedings in which a Coroner holds an inquest in Victoria.

Jurisdiction 
Coroners have jurisdiction over the remains of a person and the power to make findings in respect of the cause of death of a person.  When a serious criminal offence has been disclosed during the course of an inquest, the Coroner may adjourn the proceedings until the criminal proceedings are concluded.

Coroners may also hold inquests concerning the cause of any fire in Victoria, unlike their English counterparts.

Generally there are no appeals from the decision of a coroner, although there is provision for the Supreme Court of Victoria to order an inquest or to grant prerogative relief in respect of the proceedings.

The State Coroner may also in some circumstances order the re-opening of an inquest.

History 
The office of coroner in Victoria derives from the legal framework inherited from the United Kingdom. The first Governor of New South Wales, Arthur Phillip, was a coroner by virtue of his commission as governor. The governor's commission entitled him to appoint coroners for the Colony of New South Wales, and this was most likely to have been to justices of the peace. Until the District of Port Phillip became the Colony of Victoria and separated from New South Wales in 1851, coroners would have been appointed under the authority of the New South Wales law.

The first coroner of Melbourne and the county of Bourke was Dr William Byam Wilmot MD. He was appointed by the then Superintendent of Port Phillip, but later Lieutenant-Governor of the Colony of Victoria, Charles La Trobe, in 1841. The second city coroner, appointed in 1857, was Dr Richard Youl MD, while the third city coroner, appointed at the death of Youl in 1897 was Mr Samuel Curtis Candler.

The first temporary morgue in Melbourne was erected on the corner of Flinders Street and Swanston Street in 1871, while the first permanent coroner's courthouse was constructed alongside the Yarra River in 1888. The courthouse building was demolished in 1959.

Structure and jurisdiction 
The Governor of Victoria may appoint a State Coroner for Victoria.  The State Coroner has the function to oversee and co-ordinate coronial services in Victoria,  ensure that all deaths, suspected deaths and fires concerning which a coroner has jurisdiction to hold an inquest are properly investigated, ensuring that an inquest is held whenever it is required, and to issue guidelines to coroners to assist them in the exercise or performance of their functions.

The Governor may also appoint Deputy State Coroners. Deputy State Coroners may exercise any of the functions of the State Coroner delegated by the State Coroner to them.   Both must be either a County Court of Victoria judge, a magistrate, or a lawyer.

The Governor may also appoint Coroners.

The Governor may also appoint a magistrate as a coroner.  Unlike in other Australian states, all magistrates in Victoria do not automatically become coroners by virtue of their appointment as a magistrate.

References

Sources 
Homepage of the court – http://www.coronerscourt.vic.gov.au
Coroners Act 1985 (Vic) – http://www.austlii.edu.au/au/legis/vic/consol_act/ca1985120/

Victoria (Australia) courts and tribunals
Victoria